Lawrence Hughes may refer to:
Lawrence Hughes (actor), American actor in 1922 film The Altar Stairs
Ronald Lawrence Hughes (1920–2003), Australian army officer
Laurie Hughes (1924–2011), English footballer, played in 1950 World Cup
Larry Hughes (politician) (1931–2000), American politician in Ohio
Lawrence Hughes (golf course designer), designer of Thunderbird Country Club golf course
Lawrence Hughes, unsuccessful candidate in 1980 Northern Territory general election in Australia
Lawrence D. Hughes, racehorse trainer in 1991 Bourbonette Oaks
Lawrence Hughes, Canadian businessman, founder of CipherTrust
Lawrence Hughes, American boxer who lost 2014 to Joachim Alcine

See also 
Lawrence E. Hughes Memorial Highway in Ohio State Route 315